Eranchiparamb is a small village in Chathamangalam panchayat in Kozhikode district, Kerala, India. It is located near Koolimad.

Kozhikode east